North River is an unincorporated community in Marion County, in the U.S. state of Missouri.

History
A post office called North River was established in 1870, and remained in operation until 1887. The community took its name from the nearby North River.

References

Unincorporated communities in Marion County, Missouri
Unincorporated communities in Missouri